Scutariellidae is a family of flatworms belonging to the order Rhabdocoela.

Genera:
 Bubalocerus Matjasic, 1958
 Caradinicola Annandale, 1912
 Caridinicola Annandale, 1912
 Cercomeria
 Monodiscus Plate, 1914
 Paracaridinicola Baer, 1953
 Scutariella Mrazek, 1907
 Stygodycticola Matjasic, 1958
 Stygodyticola Matjasic, 1958
 Subtelsonia Matjasic, 1958
 Troglocaridicola Matjasic, 1958

References

Platyhelminthes